The 2019 AMA Motocross Championship season is the 47th AMA Motocross National Championship season, the premier motocross series in USA. Eli Tomac goes into the season as the defending champion in the 450 class, after taking his second 450 national title in 2018.

Calendar and Results

450cc

250cc

450cc

Riders Championship
{|
|

250cc

Riders Championship
{|
|

References 

AMA Motocross Championship
AMA National Motocross Championship